Tristan Lamasine was the defending champion but chose not to defend his title.

Kimmer Coppejans won the title after defeating Aslan Karatsev 6–4, 3–6, 7–5 in the final.

Seeds

Draw

Finals

Top half

Bottom half

References
 Main Draw
 Qualifying Draw

Tampere Open - Singles
2016 Men's Singles